The 1993–94 NBA season was the 48th season for the Boston Celtics in the National Basketball Association. Tragedy struck the team prior to the season when star guard, and team captain Reggie Lewis died of cardiac arrest during practice at the age of 27 on July 27, 1993; Lewis previously collapsed during Game 1 of the Eastern Conference First Round against the Charlotte Hornets in the 1993 NBA Playoffs. Croatian rookie forward Dino Radja, who was drafted by the Celtics in the 1989 NBA draft, would finally make his debut in the NBA. The Celtics started strong with a 6–2 start to the season, and then played mostly mediocre basketball the rest of the season, hovering at around .500 until right before Christmas when they went on a 7-game losing streak. The Celtics had a 7-game winning streak in January, and held a 20–27 record at the All-Star break, but also had a winless month in February, where they suffered a 13-game losing streak which they never recovered from, as they finished fifth in the Atlantic Division with a disappointing 32–50 record.

This season marked the first since 1978–79 that the Celtics failed to qualify for the NBA Playoffs (a streak of 14 seasons). The absence of Lewis, and the retirements over the previous two seasons of Larry Bird and Kevin McHale contributed to the poor season. Dee Brown led the team with 15.5 points and 2.0 steals per game, while Radja averaged 15.1 points and 7.2 rebounds per game, and was named to the NBA All-Rookie Second Team, and Sherman Douglas provided the team with 13.3 points and 8.8 assists per game. In addition, long-time Celtics center Robert Parish averaged 11.7 points and 7.3 rebounds per game, while Kevin Gamble provided with 11.5 points per game, and Rick Fox contributed 10.8 points per game.

Following the season, Parish signed as a free agent with the Charlotte Hornets, while Gamble signed with the Miami Heat, and Ed Pinckney was traded to the Milwaukee Bucks.

Draft picks

Roster

Roster Notes
 Center Alaa Abdelnaby holds both American and Egyptian citizenship.

Regular season

Season standings

Record vs. opponents

Game log

Player statistics

Awards and records
 Dino Radja, NBA All-Rookie Team 2nd Team

Transactions

Additions

References

See also
 1993–94 NBA season

Boston Celtics seasons
Boston Celtics
Boston Celtics
Boston Celtics
Celtics
Celtics